Pura Purani (Aymara pura pura Xenophyllum (or a species of it), -ni a suffix to indicate ownership, "the one with the pura pura plant", also spelled Purapurani) is a mountain in the Andes of southern Peru, about  high. It is located on the border of the Moquegua Region, General Sánchez Cerro Province, Ichuña District, and the Puno Region, Puno Province, San Antonio District. It lies west of Chuqipata and northwest of Millu.

References

Mountains of Moquegua Region
Mountains of Puno Region
Mountains of Peru